Derrel McKinley "Bud" Harrelson (born June 6, 1944) is a former Major League Baseball shortstop. He is a coach and part-owner of the Long Island Ducks of the Atlantic League of Professional Baseball. After his retirement as a player, he served as a coach for the World Champion  Mets, and as manager of the Mets in 1990 and 1991. Harrelson is the only person to take part in both of the Mets' World Series championships and appear in the first three world series for the team; he won in 1969 and appeared in the 1973 World Series as a player and in 1986 as a coach. Harrelson is also the only person in Mets franchise history to have appeared in four playoff seasons; as a player in 1969 and 1973; and as a coach in 1986 and 1988.

Playing career

New York Mets
Harrelson anchored the Mets' infield for 13 seasons, including their  season, and  pennant-winning season. Harrelson was typical of shortstops of his era: a good fielder, but poor hitter. He was a National League All-Star in 1970 and received Most Valuable Player Award consideration despite batting only .243 for the season.

Amazin' Mets
On May 28, 1969, after a five-game losing streak that saw the Mets fall into fourth place in the newly aligned National League East, Jerry Koosman and the San Diego Padres' Clay Kirby engaged in a pitchers' duel at Shea Stadium. After nine scoreless innings by Kirby and ten by Koosman, the game was turned over to the bullpens for extra innings. The game finally ended after 11 innings when Harrelson hit a single to drive in Cleon Jones.  This led to an 11-game winning streak that brought them back into second place, seven games back of the Chicago Cubs.  Before the streak, the Mets' record was 18-23; they went 82-39 over the rest of the season.

On September 10, the Mets swept a double header against the Montreal Expos. Coupled with a loss by the Cubs, the Mets jumped into first place for the first time in franchise history. On September 24, the New York Mets clinched the NL East with a 6-0 victory over Steve Carlton and the St. Louis Cardinals. The Mets won 38 of their last 50 games, and finished the season with 100 wins against 62 losses, eight games over the second place Cubs. For his part, Harrelson batted .248 with no home runs, 24 runs batted in and 42 runs scored. He had a .969 fielding percentage in 119 games at shortstop.

1969 postseason
Harrelson had only two hits in the 1969 National League Championship Series against the Atlanta Braves. However, they were a go-ahead triple in the fourth inning of the first game, and an RBI double in game two of the Mets' three game sweep.

Fight with Pete Rose
Harrelson's light hitting became the subject of controversy during the 1973 National League Championship Series. Mets starter Jon Matlack held the Cincinnati Reds to two hits in his 5-0 complete game victory in Game Two of the series at Riverfront Stadium. Following the game, Harrelson commented, "He made the Big Red Machine look like me hitting today."

Inadvertently providing the Reds with bulletin board material, Harrelson was confronted by Reds second baseman Joe Morgan during pregame warm-ups for Game Three. During this confrontation, he received the warning that  batting champion Pete Rose was unhappy with the quote.

In the fifth inning, Morgan hit a double play ball to Mets first baseman John Milner with Rose on first. Whether Rose slid hard into second attempting to break up the double play or if Harrelson was overly sensitive due to the warning he received is a matter of debate. Regardless, a fight between the two erupted, resulting in a bench-clearing brawl. The game was nearly called off when, after the Reds took the field, the Shea Stadium crowd threw objects from the stands at Rose, causing Reds manager Sparky Anderson to pull his team off the field until order was restored. Mets manager Yogi Berra and players Willie Mays, Tom Seaver, Cleon Jones, and Rusty Staub were actually summoned by National League President Chub Feeney out to left field to calm the fans.

When order was restored, the Mets went on to defeat the Reds handily in Game Three by a score of 9-2. Although the Reds forced a deciding game five when Pete Rose hit the game-winning home run in the 12th inning of game 4, the Mets ultimately won the pennant after the game five win.

Phillies and Rangers
After the Mets reacquired former #1 overall pick Tim Foli, Harrelson was traded to the Philadelphia Phillies for Fred Andrews and cash on March 23, 1978. Rose and Harrelson actually became teammates when Rose signed with the Phillies as a free agent prior to the start of the  season. After two seasons with the Phillies, Harrelson spent one season with the Texas Rangers before retiring.

In , Harrelson was inducted into the New York Mets Hall of Fame.

Post playing career

When Mets third base coach Bobby Valentine accepted a managerial position with the Texas Rangers part way through the 1985 season, Harrelson replaced him on Davey Johnson's coaching staff.

Harrelson was a coach with the Mets during their 1986 World Series championship season, and eventually replaced Johnson following his dismissal as Mets manager 42 games into the  season. He led the Mets to their seventh consecutive winning season, finishing at 91-71 and earning another season as manager. Although the Mets were contenders for most of the first half of the 1991 season and were as close as 2.5 games behind the eventual division winning Pittsburgh Pirates, the team collapsed in the second half and Harrelson was fired with a week remaining in the season and replaced by his third base coach, Mike Cubbage. His second season ended with a 74-80 record; the Mets finished at 77-84, one-half game behind the fourth place Chicago Cubs.

During the 1990 season, Harrelson hosted his own radio show called The Bud Harrelson Report in New York on then-Mets flagship station WFAN but ended it prematurely early in the 1991 season because Harrelson felt some of Howie Rose's questions he posed to him were too negative.

Personal life
Harrelson was born on D-Day: June 6, 1944. He grew up in Hayward, California, where he attended Sunset High School, graduating in 1962. He married his first wife, Yvonne, on December 17, 1965. They later divorced, and Harrelson married Kim Battaglia in 1975. Bud's children are Kimberly, Jessica, Timothy, Alexandra, Kassandra, and Troy Joseph. Harrelson was inducted into the Suffolk Sports Hall of Fame on Long Island in the Baseball Category with the Class of 1992. He appeared as himself in a  episode of Everybody Loves Raymond along with several other members of the 1969 Mets. Harrelson resides in Hauppauge, New York. In 2000, he became co-owner, Senior Vice President for Baseball Operations, and first base coach of the Long Island Ducks, an unaffiliated minor league baseball team. Harrelson was diagnosed with Alzheimer's disease in 2016.

References

External links

Bud Harrelson at SABR (Baseball BioProject)
Bud Harrelson at Baseball Almanac
Bud Harrelson at Baseball Biography
Bud Harrelson at Ultimate Mets Database

1944 births
Living people
People from Fremont, California
People from Hauppauge, New York
People from Hayward, California
Sportspeople from Hayward, California
Baseball players from California
Buffalo Bisons (minor league) players
Gold Glove Award winners
Jacksonville Suns players
Major League Baseball broadcasters
Major League Baseball shortstops
Minor league baseball coaches
National League All-Stars
New York Mets announcers
New York Mets coaches
New York Mets managers
New York Mets players
New York Mets scouts
Philadelphia Phillies players
Salinas Mets players
San Francisco State Gators baseball players
Texas Rangers players